The President of the Legislative Assembly is the speaker of the Legislative Assembly of Macau. In the absence of the President, the Vice-President serves as President.

List of presidents

List of presidents of the Legislative Assembly of Macau (before 20 December 1999)

List of presidents of the Legislative Assembly of Macau (20 December 1999 – present)

List of vice-presidents

List of vice-presidents of the Legislative Assembly of Macau (before 20 December 1999)

List of vice-presidents of the Legislative Assembly of Macau (20 December 1999 – present)

References
 Macau Parl

Macau, President of the Legislative Assembly of
Legislative Assembly of Macau